Huzoor Palace may refer to:

Huzoor Palace, Gondal
Huzoor Palace, Porbandar